Peter Terium (born September 26, 1963) is a Dutch business executive and was the Chief Executive Officer of innogy from 1 April 2016 until 19 December 2017. He served as CEO of RWE from 2012 until 2016.

Life
Terium is a trained accountant and began his career as an auditor at the Ministry of Finance (Netherlands) followed by positions at KPMG as well as Schmalbach-Lubeca. Peter Terium joined the RWE Group on 1 January 2003: He started as Head of Group Controlling at RWE AG and in 2004 also became Member of the Executive Board of RWE Umwelt AG. In July 2005 Peter Terium was appointed Chief Executive Officer of RWE Trading GmbH. His responsibilities included the merger of RWE Trading GmbH and RWE Gas Midstream GmbH into RWE Supply & Trading GmbH, of which he became Chief Executive Officer in April 2008.

From 2009 until 31 December 2011 he served as CEO of Essent, a subsidiary of the German energy supplier RWE. He was appointed Deputy Chairman of the Executive Board of RWE AG on 1 September 2011. From 1 July 2012 until 14 October 2016 Terium was Chief Executive Officer of RWE AG. While Rolf Martin Schmitz succeeded him in this position in 2016, he moved to RWE's subsidiary Innogy SE, where he functions as CEO since 1 April 2016.

References

1963 births
Living people
Dutch chief executives in the oil industry
People from Nederweert
RWE